Moscow Metallurgical Plant in Moscow, Russia was founded in 1883 as a metallurgic workshop and became known as the Goujon (or Guzhon) Plant (завод Гужона). It is one of the oldest major industrial enterprises in the middle Russia. In the Soviet era it was renamed after the Communist "Hammer and sickle" symbol. In 2011 the plant was decommissioned.

The major markets are Russia (85%), Belarus (12%), and Ukraine (1%) Non-CIS market is within 1-2%.

History
From 1883 to 1917, the plant was known as the Association of the Moscow Metallic Plant (Guzhon Plant) - Товарищество Московского металлического завода (завода Гужона). From July, 1917 to November, 1922: Московский Государственный металлический завод №9, Moscow State Metallic Plant #9. From 1922 to 1992: Московский металлургический завод "Серп и молот", Moscow Metallurgical Plant Serp i Molot. From November 25, 1992 to 1997: Акционерное общество 'Московский металлургический завод "Серп и молот"', Joint-stock company "Moscow Metallurgical Plant Serp i Molot". From July 17, 1997 onwards: Открытое акционерное общество 'Московский металлургический завод "Серп и молот"',  Open joint-stock company 'Moscow Metallurgical Plant Serp i Molot ' (ОАО "СиМ СТ", OAO "SIM ST").

In April 2011 the plant stopped operating. In 2014 a plan to redevelop the territory of the plant for housing was approved. In March 2015 the housing construction started

Ownership and management
2004:
Chairman of the Board of Directors: Lev Sadovsky (Садовский Лев Николаевич, b. 1939)
Director General: Sergey Parenkov (Пареньков Сергей Леонидович, b. 1961)
Real estate: 871,625,538 rubles 
Nominal capital: 1,532,422,528 rubles

Major stockholders 
The company does not have the "Golden Share" (rights of federal subjects to manage the business). Moscow City has a considerable share of stock of the plant.

Below, the percentages indicate both the shares held and the nominal capital.
Открытое акционерное общество "МЕТА - ИНВЕСТ", 33.3%
Акционерный коммерческий "Московский муниципальный банк – Банк Москвы", 37%
Банк Москвы (Департамент имущества города Москвы) – 16,84%

Subsidiaries 
Закрытое акционерное общество "Производственно-строительный монтажный трест "Серп и молот"
Общество с ограниченной ответственностью "СиМ-Инвест"
Закрытое Акционерное Общество Таможенно – брокерский комплекс "Гужон"

See also 
Severstal

References

External links
Serp i Molot plant website
 

Manufacturing companies of the Soviet Union
Manufacturing companies based in Moscow
Companies established in 1883
Demolished buildings and structures in Moscow
Defunct iron and steel mills
Defunct manufacturing companies of Russia